Trachyschistis is a genus of moths belonging to the subfamily Olethreutinae of the family Tortricidae.

Species
Trachyschistis hians Meyrick, 1921

See also
List of Tortricidae genera

References

External links
tortricidae.com

Tortricidae genera
Olethreutinae
Taxa named by Edward Meyrick